VBV is a three letter acronym that can refer to:

 Verified by Visa, an online security system for credit card transactions
 The Video buffering verifier, a theoretical MPEG video decoder used to assess bitstream compliance
 The Vanuabalavu Airport in Vanua Balavu, Fiji, which uses IATA airport code VBV.